Sintilimab, sold under the brand Tyvyt among others, is a medication used to treat Hodgkin's disease, and has been approved in China.

It is a fully human IgG4 monoclonal antibody that binds to programmed cell death protein 1.

It was jointly developed by Innovent Biologics and Eli Lilly.

Medical uses
Sintilimab is medication that is indicated for the treatment of relapsed or refractory classical Hodgkin's lymphoma after failure of at least second-line systemic chemotherapy.

Side effects
Common side effects include fever, thyroid dysfunction, elevation of liver enzymes, and lung inflammation.

Research
Currently, more than 20 clinical trials are ongoing to evaluate the anti-tumor effect of sintilimab injection, either as monotherapy or in combination with other agents, on a variety of solid tumors. In January 2019, the result of the registration trial of sintilimab in people with refractory or relapsed classical Hodgkin's lymphoma was published.

References 

Cancer immunotherapy
Monoclonal antibodies for tumors